Mahmood Mamdani, FBA (born 23 April 1946) is an Indian-born Ugandan academic, author, and political commentator. He currently serves as the Chancellor of Kampala International University, Uganda. He was the director of the Makerere Institute of Social Research (MISR) from 2010 until February 2022, the Herbert Lehman Professor of Government at the School of International and Public Affairs, Columbia University and the Professor of Anthropology, Political Science and African Studies at Columbia University.

Early life and education
Mamdani is a third generation Ugandan of Indian ancestry. He was born in Mumbai and grew up in Kampala. Both his parents were born in the neighbouring Tanganyika Territory (present day Tanzania). He was educated at the Government Primary School in Dar es Salaam, Government Primary School in Masaka, K.S.I. Primary School in Kampala, Shimoni and Nakivubo Government Primary Schools in Kampala, and Old Kampala Senior Secondary School.

He received a scholarship along with 26 other Ugandan students to study in the United States. He was part of the 1963 group of the Kennedy Airlift, a scholarship program that brought hundreds of East Africans to universities in the United States and Canada between 1959 and 1963. The scholarships were part of the independence gift that the new nation had received. Mamdani joined the University of Pittsburgh in 1963 and graduated with a Bachelor of Arts in political science in 1967.

He was among the many students in the northern US who made the bus journey south to Montgomery, Alabama, organized by the Student Nonviolent Coordinating Committee (SNCC) in March 1965, to participate in the civil rights movement.  This was in Montgomery, during the time of but distinct from the Selma to Montgomery marches. He was jailed during the march and was allowed to make a phone call. Mamdani called the Ugandan Ambassador in Washington, D.C., for assistance. The ambassador asked him why he was "interfering in the internal affairs of a foreign country", to which he responded by saying that this was not an internal affair but a freedom struggle and that they too had gotten their freedom only last year. Soon after he learnt about Karl Marx's work from an FBI visit.

He then joined The Fletcher School of Law and Diplomacy and graduated in 1968 with a Master of Arts in political science and Master of Arts in Law and Diplomacy in 1969. He attained his Doctor of Philosophy in government from Harvard University in 1974. His thesis was titled Politics and Class Formation in Uganda.

Career
Mamdani returned to Uganda in early 1972 and joined Makerere University as a teaching assistant at the same time conducting his doctoral research; only to be expelled later that year by Idi Amin due to his ethnicity. He left Uganda for a refugee camp in the United Kingdom in early November just as the three-month deadline was approaching for people of Asian heritage to leave the country.

He left England in mid-1973 after being recruited to the University of Dar es Salaam in Tanzania. In Dar es Salaam, he completed writing his thesis and was active with anti-Amin groups. In 1979, he attended the Moshi Conference as an observer and returned to Uganda after Amin was overthrown following the Uganda–Tanzania War as a Frontier Interne of the World Council of Churches. He was posted with the Church of Uganda offices in Mengo and was assigned to research the former regime's foreign relations. His report was published as a book: Imperialism and Fascism in Uganda.

In 1984, while attending a conference in Dakar, Senegal, he became stateless after his citizenship was withdrawn by the government under Milton Obote due to his criticism of its policies. He returned to Dar es Salaam and was a visiting professor at the University of Michigan, Ann Arbor for the spring semester in 1986. After Obote was deposed for the second time, Mamdani once again returned to Uganda in June 1986. He was the founding director of the Centre for Basic Research (CBR), Uganda's first research non-governmental organisation from 1987 to 2006.

He was also a visiting professor at the University of Durban-Westville in South Africa (January to June in 1993), at the Nehru Memorial Museum & Library in New Delhi (January to June in 1995) and at Princeton University (1995–96).

In 1996, he was appointed as the inaugural holder of the AC Jordan chair of African studies at the University of Cape Town. He left after having disagreements with the administration on his draft syllabus of a foundation course on Africa called "Problematizing Africa". This was dubbed the "Mamdani Affair". From 1998 to 2002, he served as president of the Council for the Development of Social Science Research in Africa. In December 2001, he gave a speech on "Making Sense of Violence in Postcolonial Africa" at the Nobel Centennial Symposia in Oslo, Norway.

In 2008, in an open online poll, Mamdani was voted as the ninth "top public intellectual" in the world on the list of Top 100 Public Intellectuals by Prospect Magazine (UK) and Foreign Policy (US). His essays have appeared in the London Review of Books, among other journals.

Work
Mamdani specialises in the study of African and international politics, colonialism and post‐colonialism, and the politics of knowledge production. His works explore the intersection between politics and culture, a comparative study of colonialism since 1452, the history of civil war and genocide in Africa, the Cold War and the War on Terror, and the history and theory of human rights.

His current research "takes as its point of departure his 1996 book, Citizen and Subject: Contemporary Africa and the Legacy of Colonialism". In Citizen and Subject, Mamdani argues that the post-colonial state cannot be understood without a clear analysis of the institutional colonial state. The nature of the colonial state in Africa was a response to the dilemma of the 'native question' and argued that it took on the form of a 'Bifurcated State'. This was characterised by 'direct rule' on the one hand which was a form of 'urban civil power' and focused on the exclusion of natives from civil freedoms guaranteed to citizens in civil society. Whilst on the other it was characterised by indirect rule which was rural in nature and involved the incorporation of 'natives' into a 'state enforced customary order' enforced by a 'rural tribal authority' which he termed as 'decentralised despotism'. This state was 'Janus faced' and 'contained a duality: two forms of power under a single hegemonic authority'. In the post-colonial realm, the urban sphere was to an extent deracialised but the rural one remained subject to quasi colonial control whether at the hands of conservative rulers for whom it provided their own power base or those of radical ones with centralised authoritarian projects of their own. In this way both experiences reproduced 'one part of the dual legacy of the bifurcated state and created their own distinctive version of despotism'. Mamdani analyses extensive historical case studies in South Africa and Uganda to argue that colonial rule tapped into authoritarian possibilities whose legacies often persist after independence. Challenging conventional perceptions of apartheid in South Africa as exceptional, he argues that apartheid was the generic form of a European colony in Africa, encompassing aspects of indirect rule and association.

Personal life
Mamdani is married to Mira Nair, an Indian film director and producer. They met in Kampala, Uganda, in 1989 when Nair was conducting research for her film, Mississippi Masala. She had read his book The Myth of Population Control while an undergraduate at university and From Citizen to Refugee just before their meeting. They married in 1991 and have a son, Zohran Mamdani, a current member of the New York State Assembly, representing the 36th District in Queens.

Honours and awards

Awards
1997: Herskovits Prize for Citizen and Subject: Contemporary Africa and the Legacy of Colonialism
1999: University of Cape Town Book Award for Citizen and Subject: Contemporary Africa and the Legacy of Colonialism
2009: GDS Eminent Scholar Award from the International Studies Association
2011: Lenfest Distinguished Faculty Award
2012: Scholar of the Year at the 2nd Annual African Diaspora Awards for his immense contribution to African Scholarship
2012: Ugandan Diaspora Award 2012

In July 2017, Mamdani was elected a Corresponding Fellow of the British Academy (FBA), the United Kingdom's national academy for the humanities and social sciences.

Honorary degrees
University of Johannesburg, DLitt (Honoris Causa), 25 May 2010
Addis Ababa University, Doctor of Letters (Honoris Causa), 24 July 2010
University of KwaZulu-Natal, DLitt (Honoris Causa), April 2012

Bibliography

Books
 The Myth of Population Control: Family, Class and Caste in an Indian Village (1972)
 From Citizen to Refugee: Ugandan Asians Come to Britain (1973)
 Politics and Class Formation in Uganda (1976)
 Imperialism and Fascism in Uganda (1984)
 Academic Freedom in Africa (1994)
 Citizen and Subject: Contemporary Africa and the Legacy of Late Colonialism (1996)
 When Victims Become Killers: Colonialism, Nativism and Genocide in Rwanda (2001)
 Understanding the Crisis in Kivu
 Good Muslim, Bad Muslim: America, the Cold War and the Roots of Terror (2004)
 Scholars in the Marketplace. The Dilemmas of Neo-Liberal Reform at Makerere University, 1989–2005 (2007)
 Saviors and Survivors: Darfur, Politics, and the War on Terror (2009)
 Define and Rule: Native as Political Identity (The W.E.B. DuBois Lectures) (2012)
 Neither Settler nor Native: The Making and Unmaking of Permanent Minorities (2020)

Collected essays
 Beyond Rights Talk and Culture Talk: Comparative Essays on the Politics of Rights and Culture (2000)

Edited volumes
Uganda Studies in Labour (Codesria Book Series) (1968)

Other works
Studies in Labor Markets (National Bureau of Economic Research Universities-National Bureau Conference Ser)
African Studies in Social Movements and Democracy (Actes-Sud Papiers)

See also
 Indians in the New York City metropolitan area

References

External links

1946 births
Living people
Writers from Mumbai
Scholars from Mumbai
People from Kampala
Gujarati people
Indian expatriate academics
Ugandan people of Indian descent
Indian Africanists
Ugandan Africanists
Indian political scientists
Ugandan political scientists
Indian academic administrators
Ugandan academic administrators
Indian Ismailis
Ugandan Ismailis
Political commentators
Corresponding Fellows of the British Academy
University of Pittsburgh alumni
The Fletcher School at Tufts University alumni
Harvard University alumni
Academic staff of the University of Dar es Salaam
Academic staff of Makerere University
Academic staff of the University of Cape Town
Academic staff of Kampala International University
Columbia School of International and Public Affairs faculty